Pseliastis trizona is a moth of the family Heliozelidae. It was described by Edward Meyrick in 1897. It is found in Tasmania.

References

Moths described in 1897
Heliozelidae